The 1987 Grand Prix de Tennis de Lyon was a men's tennis tournament played on indoor carpet courts at the Palais des Sports de Gerland in Lyon, France, and was part of the 1987 Nabisco Grand Prix. It was the inaugural edition of the tournament and ran from 2 February through 9 February 1987. First-seeded Yannick Noah, who entered on a wildcard, won the singles title.

Finals

Singles

 Yannick Noah defeated  Joakim Nyström 6–4, 7–5
 It was Noah's 2nd title of the year and the 29th of his career.

Doubles

 Guy Forget /  Yannick Noah defeated  Kelly Jones /  David Pate 4–6, 6–3, 6–4
 It was Forget's 1st title of the year and the 10th of his career. It was Noah's 1st title of the year and the 28th of his career.

References

External links
 ITF tournament edition details

Grand Prix de Tennis de Lyon
Open Sud de France
Grand Prix de Tennis de Lyon